Malafeyevo is a rural locality (a village) in Semizerye Rural Settlement, Kaduysky District, Vologda Oblast, Russia. The population was 5 as of 2002.

Geography 
Malafeyevo is located 20 km southwest of Kaduy (the district's administrative centre) by road. Vershina is the nearest rural locality.

References 

Rural localities in Kaduysky District